Foraker is a surname. Notable people with the surname include:

Joseph B. Foraker (1846–1917), Governor of Ohio and U.S. senator
Lois Foraker, American actress

Fictional characters:
Shannon Foraker, recurring character in the Honorverse science fiction book series